The 1844 United States presidential election in Rhode Island took place between November 1 and December 4, 1844, as part of the 1844 United States presidential election. Voters chose four representatives, or electors to the Electoral College, who voted for President and Vice President.

Rhode Island voted for the Whig candidate, Henry Clay, over Democratic candidate James K. Polk. Clay won Rhode Island by a margin of 19.97%.

With 59.55% of the popular vote, Rhode Island would prove to be Henry Clay's strongest state in the nation.

Results

See also
 United States presidential elections in Rhode Island

References

Rhode Island
1844
1844 Rhode Island elections